Kach Banda is a town and union council in Hangu District of Khyber-Pakhtunkhwa. It is located at 33°32'58N 71°5'10E and has an altitude of 785 metres (2578 feet).

References

Union councils of Hangu District
Populated places in Hangu District, Pakistan